South Sudan, officially the Republic of South Sudan, is a landlocked country in Eastern Africa. It is bordered by Ethiopia, Sudan, the Central African Republic, the Democratic Republic of the Congo, Uganda, and Kenya. Its population was estimated at 10,913,164 in 2022. Juba is the capital and largest city.

It gained independence from Sudan on 9 July 2011, making it the most recent sovereign state or country with widespread recognition as of 2023. It includes the vast swamp region of the Sudd, formed by the White Nile and known locally as the Bahr al Jabal, meaning "Mountain River". Sudan was occupied by Egypt under the Muhammad Ali dynasty and was governed as an Anglo-Egyptian condominium until Sudanese independence in 1956. Following the First Sudanese Civil War, the Southern Sudan Autonomous Region was formed in 1972 and lasted until 1983. A second Sudanese civil war soon broke out in 1983 and ended in 2005 with the Comprehensive Peace Agreement. Later that year, southern autonomy was restored when an Autonomous Government of Southern Sudan was formed. South Sudan became an independent state on 9 July 2011, following 98.83% support for independence in a January 2011 referendum. It has suffered ethnic violence and endured a civil war characterized by rampant human rights abuses, including various ethnic massacres and killings of journalists by various parties to the conflict from December 2013 until February 2020, when competing combat leaders Salva Kiir Mayardit  and Riek Machar struck a unity deal and formed a coalition government, paving the way for refugees to return home.

South Sudan is a developing country ranking 191st (last) on the Human Development Index, and is also one of the poorest countries in the world by GDP per capita. The South Sudanese population is composed mostly of Nilotic peoples, and it is demographically among the youngest nations in the world, with roughly half under 18 years old. The majority of inhabitants adhere to Christianity or various Indigenous faiths. The country is a member of the United Nations, the African Union, the East African Community, and the Intergovernmental Authority on Development.

Etymology
The name Sudan is a name given to a geographical region to the south of the Sahara, stretching from Western Africa to eastern Central Africa. The name derives from the Arabic , or the "Land of the Blacks" The term was used by Arab traders and travelers in the region to refer to the various indigenous black African cultures and societies that they encountered.

History 

The Nilotic people of South Sudan—the Dinka, Anyuak, Bari, Acholi, Nuer, Shilluk, Kaligi (Arabic Feroghe), and others—first entered South Sudan sometime before the tenth century, coinciding with the fall of medieval Nubia. From the 15th to the 19th century, tribal migrations, largely from the area of Bahr el Ghazal, brought the Anyuak, Dinka, Nuer, and Shilluk to their modern locations in Bahr El Ghazal and the Upper Nile Region, while the Acholi and Bari settled in Equatoria. The Zande, Mundu, Avukaya and Baka, who entered South Sudan in the 16th century, established the region's largest state of Equatoria Region.

The Dinka is the largest, the Nuer the second-largest, the Zande the third-largest, and the Bari the fourth-largest of South Sudan's ethnic groups. They are found in the Maridi, Yambio, and Tombura districts in the tropical rainforest belt of Western Equatoria, the Adio of Azande client in Yei, Central Equatoria, and Western Bahr el Ghazal. In the 18th century, the Avungara sib rose to power over the rest of Azande society, a domination that continued into the 20th century. British policies favoring Christian missionaries, such as the Closed District Ordinance of 1922 (see History of Anglo-Egyptian Sudan), and geographical barriers such as the swamplands along the White Nile curtailed the spread of Islam to the south, thus allowing the southern tribes to retain much of their social and cultural heritage, as well as their political and religious institutions.

British colonial policy in Sudan had a long history of emphasizing the development of the Arab north, and largely ignoring the Black African south, which lacked schools, hospitals, roads, bridges, and other basic infrastructure. After Sudan's first independent elections in 1958, the continued neglect of the southern region by the Khartoum government led to uprisings, revolts, and the longest civil war on the continent. People affected by the violence included the Dinka, Nuer, Shilluk, Anyuak, Murle, Bari, Mundari, Baka, Balanda Bviri,  Boya, Didinga, Jiye, Kaligi, Kuku, Lotuka, Nilotic, Toposa, and Zande.

The Azande have had good relations with their neighbours, namely the Moru, Mundu, Pöjulu, Avukaya, Baka, and the small groups in Bahr el Ghazal, due to the expansionist policy of their king Gbudwe, in the 18th century. In the 19th century, the Azande fought the French, the Belgians and the Mahdists to maintain their independence. Ottoman Egypt, under the rule of Khedive Ismail Pasha, first attempted to control the region in the 1870s, establishing the province of Equatoria in the southern portion. Egypt's first appointed governor was Samuel Baker, commissioned in 1869, followed by Charles George Gordon in 1874, and by Emin Pasha in 1878.

The Mahdist Revolt of the 1880s destabilized the nascent province, and Equatoria ceased to exist as an Egyptian outpost in 1889. Important settlements in Equatoria included Lado, Gondokoro, Dufile, and Wadelai. European colonial maneuverings in the region came to a head in 1898, when the Fashoda Incident occurred at present-day Kodok; Britain and France almost went to war over the region. In 1947, British hopes of joining South Sudan with Uganda while leaving Western Equatoria as part of the Belgian Congo were dashed by the Rajaf Conference to unify North and South Sudan.

South Sudan has an estimated population of 8 million, but, given the lack of a census in several decades, this estimate may be severely distorted. The economy is predominantly rural and relies chiefly on subsistence farming. Around 2005, the economy began a transition from this rural dominance, and urban areas within South Sudan have seen extensive development.

The region has been negatively affected by two civil wars since Sudanese independence: from 1955 to 1972, the Sudanese government fought the Anyanya rebel army (Anya-Nya is a term in the Madi language which means "snake venom") during the First Sudanese Civil War, followed by the Sudan People's Liberation Army/Movement (SPLA/M) in the Second Sudanese Civil War for over twenty years, from 1983 to 2005. As a result, the country suffered serious neglect, a lack of infrastructure development, and major destruction and displacement. More than 2.5 million people have been killed, and millions more have become refugees both within and outside the country.

Independence (2011)

Between 9 and 15 January 2011, as a consequence of the Comprehensive Peace Agreement, a referendum was held to determine whether South Sudan should become an independent country and separate from Sudan, and 98.83% of those who took part voted for independence. On 23 January 2011, members of a steering committee on post-independence governing told reporters that upon independence the land would be named the Republic of South Sudan "out of familiarity and convenience". Other names that had been considered were Azania, Nile Republic, Kush Republic and even Juwama, a portmanteau for Juba, Wau and Malakal, three major cities. South Sudan formally became independent from Sudan on 9 July, although certain disputes still remained, including the division of oil revenues, as 75% of all the former Sudan's oil reserves are in South Sudan. The region of Abyei still remains disputed and a separate referendum will be held in Abyei on whether they want to join Sudan or South Sudan. The South Kordofan conflict broke out in June 2011 between the Army of Sudan and the SPLA over the Nuba Mountains.

On 9 July 2011, South Sudan became the 54th independent country in Africa (9 July is now celebrated as Independence Day, a national holiday) and since 14 July 2011, South Sudan is the 193rd member of the United Nations. On 27 July 2011, South Sudan became the 54th country to join the African Union. In September 2011, Google Maps recognized South Sudan as an independent country, after a massive crowdsourcing mapping initiative was launched.

In 2011 it was reported that South Sudan was at war with at least seven armed groups in 9 of its 10 states, with tens of thousands displaced. The fighters accuse the government of plotting to stay in power indefinitely, not fairly representing and supporting all tribal groups while neglecting development in rural areas. Joseph Kony's Lord's Resistance Army (LRA) also operates in a wide area that includes South Sudan.

Inter-ethnic warfare in some cases predates the war of independence and is widespread. In December 2011, tribal clashes intensified between the Nuer White Army of the Lou Nuer and the Murle. The White Army warned it would wipe out the Murle and would also fight South Sudanese and UN forces sent to the area around Pibor.

In March 2012, South Sudanese forces seized the Heglig oil fields in lands claimed by both Sudan and South Sudan in the province of South Kordofan after conflict with Sudanese forces in the South Sudanese state of Unity. South Sudan withdrew on 20 March, and the Sudanese Army entered Heglig two days later.

Joining East Africa 
South Sudan and Democratic Republic of Congo are the newest members of the East African Community. South Sudan acceded to the Treaty of the East Africa Community on 15 April 2016 and become a full Member on 15 August 2016.

Civil war (2013–2020) 

On the 5th of September 2013, an article written by analyst Duop Chak Wuol was published by the US-based South Sudan News Agency (SSNA). . The writer raised critical questions surrounding what he described as the rise of autocracy within the top leadership of the Sudan People's Liberation Movement (SPLM) and warned of monumental repercussions unless the ruling elites restored the founding principles of the party. Duop also berated the ruling party, arguing that the party has replaced its founding principles with "forgotten promises and deceptions." In December 2013, a political power struggle broke out between President Kiir and his former deputy Riek Machar, as the president accused Machar and ten others of attempting a coup d'état. Fighting broke out, igniting the South Sudanese Civil War. Ugandan troops were deployed to fight alongside South Sudanese government forces against the rebels. The United Nations has peacekeepers in the country as part of the United Nations Mission in South Sudan (UNMISS). Numerous ceasefires were mediated by the Intergovernmental Authority on Development (IGAD) between the Sudan People's Liberation Movement (SPLM) and SPLM – in opposition and were subsequently broken. A peace agreement was signed in Ethiopia under threat of United Nations sanctions for both sides in August 2015. Machar returned to Juba in 2016 and was appointed vice president. Following a second breakout of violence in Juba, Machar was replaced as vice-president and he fled the country as the conflict erupted again. Rebel in-fighting has become a major part of the conflict. Rivalry among Dinka factions led by the President and Malong Awan has also led to fighting. In August 2018, another power-sharing agreement came into effect.

About 400,000 people are estimated to have been killed in the war, including notable atrocities such as the 2014 Bentiu massacre. Although both men have supporters from across South Sudan's ethnic divides, subsequent fighting has been communal, with rebels targeting members of Kiir's Dinka ethnic group and government soldiers attacking Nuers. More than 4 million people have been displaced, with about 1.8 million of those internally displaced, and about 2.5 million having fled to neighboring countries, especially Uganda and Sudan.

On 20 February 2020, Salva Kiir Mayardit and Riek Machar agreed to a peace deal, and on 22 February 2020 formed a national unity government as Machar was sworn in as the deputy leader of the country.

Despite the official cessation of the civil war, violence between armed militia groups at the community level has continued in the country; according to Yasmin Sooka, Chair of the Commission of Human Rights in Sudan, the level of violence "far exceeds the violence between 2013 and 2019".

The first democratic elections in South Sudan since the start of the civil war were scheduled for 2023 by the peace agreement that ended the war officially, but the transitional government and opposition agreed in 2022 to move them to late 2024 instead.

Government and politics

Government 

The now-defunct Southern Sudan Legislative Assembly ratified a transitional constitution shortly before independence on 9 July 2011. The constitution was signed by the President of South Sudan on Independence Day and thereby came into force. It is now the supreme law of the land, superseding the Interim Constitution of 2005.

The constitution establishes a presidential system of government headed by a president who is head of state, head of government, and commander-in-chief of the armed forces. It also establishes the National Legislature comprising two houses: a directly elected assembly, the National Legislative Assembly, and a second chamber of representatives of the states, the Council of States.

John Garang, the founder of the SPLA/M, was the first president of the autonomous government until his death on 30 July 2005. Salva Kiir Mayardit, his deputy, was sworn in as First Vice President of Sudan and President of the Government of Southern Sudan on 11 August 2005. Riek Machar replaced him as Vice-President of the Government. Legislative power is vested in the government and the bicameral National Legislature. The constitution also provides for an independent judiciary, the highest organ being the Supreme Court.

On 8 May 2021, South Sudan President Salva Kiir announced a dissolution of Parliament as part of a 2018 peace deal to set up a new legislative body that will number 550 lawmakers

National capital project 

The capital of South Sudan is located at Juba, which is also the state capital of Central Equatoria and the county seat of the eponymous Juba County, and is the country's largest city. However, due to Juba's poor infrastructure and massive urban growth, as well as its lack of centrality within South Sudan, the South Sudanese Government adopted a resolution in February 2011 to study the creation of a new planned city to serve as the seat of government. It is planned that the capital city will be changed to the more centrally located Ramciel. This proposal is functionally similar to construction projects in Abuja, Nigeria; Brasília, Brazil; and Canberra, Australia; among other modern-era planned national capitals. It is unclear how the government will fund the project.

In September 2011, a spokesman for the government said the country's political leaders had accepted a proposal to build a new capital at Ramciel, a place in Lakes state near the borders with Central Equatoria and Jonglei. Ramciel is considered to be the geographical center of the country, and the late pro-independence leader John Garang allegedly had plans to relocate the capital there before his death in 2005. The proposal was supported by the Lakes state government and at least one Ramciel tribal chief. The design, planning, and construction of the city will likely take as many as five years, government ministers said, and the move of national institutions to the new capital will be implemented in stages.

States

2011–2015 

Prior to 2015, South Sudan was divided into 10 states, which also correspond to three historical regions: Bahr el Ghazal, Equatoria, and Greater Upper Nile:

Bahr el Ghazal
Northern Bahr el Ghazal
Western Bahr el Ghazal
Lakes
Warrap

Equatoria
Western Equatoria
Central Equatoria (containing the national capital city of Juba)
Eastern Equatoria

Greater Upper Nile
Jonglei
Unity
Upper Nile

The Abyei Area, a small region of Sudan bordering on the South Sudanese states of Northern Bahr el Ghazal, Warrap, and Unity, was given special administrative status as a result of the Comprehensive Peace Agreement signed in 2005.  Following the independence of South Sudan in 2011, Abyei is considered to be simultaneously part of both the Republic of Sudan and the Republic of South Sudan, effectively a condominium. It was due to hold a referendum in 2011 on whether to join South Sudan or remain part of the Republic of Sudan, but in May of 2011, the Sudanese military seized Abyei, and it is not clear if the referendum will be held.

2015–2020 

In October 2015, South Sudan's President Salva Kiir issued a decree establishing 28 states in place of the 10 constitutionally established states. The decree established the new states largely along ethnic lines. A number of opposition parties and civil society challenged the constitutionality of this decree and Kiir later resolved to take it to parliament for approval as a constitutional amendment. In November the South Sudanese parliament empowered President Kiir to create new states.

Bar el Ghazal
Aweil
Aweil East
Eastern Lakes
Gogrial
Gok
Lol
Tonj
Twic
Wau
Western Lakes

Equatoria
Amadi
Gbudwe
Torit
Jubek (containing the national capital city of Juba)
Maridi
Kapoeta
Tambura
Terekeka
Yei River

Greater Upper Nile
Boma
Central Upper Nile
Akobo
Northern Upper Nile
Jonglei State
Latjoor
Maiwut
Northern Liech
Ruweng
Southern Liech
Bieh
Fashoda State
Fangak State

On 14 January 2017 another four states were created; Central Upper Nile, Northern Upper Nile, Tumbura and Maiwut.

2020–present

Under the terms of a peace agreement signed on 22 February 2020, South Sudan is divided into 10 states, two administrative areas and one area with special administrative status.

The Kafia Kingi area is disputed between South Sudan and Sudan and the Ilemi Triangle is disputed between South Sudan and Kenya.

The  states and administrative areas are once again grouped into the three former historical provinces of the Sudan; Bahr el Ghazal, Equatoria and Greater Upper Nile:

Bahr el Ghazal
Northern Bahr el Ghazal
Western Bahr el Ghazal
Lakes
Warrap

Equatoria
Western Equatoria
Central Equatoria (containing the national capital city of Juba)
Eastern Equatoria

Greater Upper Nile
Jonglei
Unity
Upper Nile

Administrative Areas

Greater Pibor Administrative Area
Ruweng Administrative Area

Special Administrative Status Areas
Abyei Special Administrative Area

Military 

A Defense paper was initiated in 2007 by then Minister for SPLA Affairs Dominic Dim Deng, and a draft was produced in 2008. It declared that Southern Sudan would eventually maintain land, air, and riverine forces.

, South Sudan has the third highest military spending as a percentage of GDP in the world, behind only Oman and Saudi Arabia.

Media 

While former Information Minister Barnaba Marial Benjamin vowed that South Sudan will respect freedom of the press and allow journalists unrestricted access in the country, the chief editor of Juba newspaper The Citizen claimed that in the absence of a formal media law in the fledgling republic, he and his staff have faced abuse at the hands of security forces. This alleged fettering of media freedom was attributed in an Al Jazeera report to the difficulty SPLM has faced in reforming itself as a legitimate government after years of leading a rebellion against the Sudanese government. The Citizen is South Sudan's largest newspaper, but poor infrastructure and poverty have kept its staff relatively small and limited the efficiency of both its reporting and its circulation outside of Juba, with no dedicated news bureaus in outlying states and newspapers often taking several days to reach states like Northern Bahr el Ghazal. In May 2020, South Sudan Friendship Press was established as the country's first dedicated online news website.

Censorship 
On 1 November 2011, South Sudan's National Security Services (NSS) arrested the editor of a private Juba-based daily, Destiny, and suspended its activities indefinitely. This was in response to an opinion article by columnist Dengdit Ayok, entitled "Let Me Say So", which criticized the president for allowing his daughter to marry an Ethiopian national, and accused him of "staining his patriotism". An official letter accused the newspaper of breaking "the media code of conduct and professional ethics", and of publishing "illicit news" that was defamatory, inciting, and invading the privacy of personalities. The Committee to Protect Journalists had voiced concerns over media freedoms in South Sudan in September. The NSS released the journalists without charge after having held them for 18 days.

In 2015, Salva Kiir threatened to kill journalists who reported "against the country". Work conditions have become terrible for journalists, and many have left the country. Documentary filmmaker Ochan Hannington is one of them. In August 2015, after journalist Peter Moi was killed in a targeted attack, being the seventh journalist killed during the year, South Sudanese journalists held a 24-hour news blackout.

In August 2017, a 26-year-old American journalist, Christopher Allen, was killed in Kaya, Yei River State, during fighting between government and opposition forces. Christopher Allen was a freelance journalist who had worked for several U.S. news outlets. He had been reportedly embedded with the opposition forces in South Sudan for a week before he was killed. The same month, President Salva Kiir said the millions of civilians fleeing South Sudan were being driven by the propaganda from social media users conspiring against his government. Just a month prior in July 2017, access to major news websites and popular blogs including Sudan Tribune and Radio Tamazuj had been blocked by the government without formal notice. In June 2020, access to Sudans Post, a local news website, was blocked by the government following the publication of an article deemed defamatory by the NSS. Two months later, Qurium Media Foundation, a Swedish non-profit organization, announced that it has deployed a mirror for the website to circumvent the government blocking.

Foreign relations 

Since independence, relations with Sudan have been changing. Sudan's President Omar al-Bashir first announced, in January 2011, that dual citizenship in the North and the South would be allowed, but upon the independence of South Sudan he retracted the offer. He has also suggested an EU-style confederation. Essam Sharaf, Prime Minister of Egypt after the 2011 Egyptian Revolution, made his first foreign visit to Khartoum and Juba in the lead-up to South Sudan's secession. Israel quickly recognized South Sudan as an independent country, and is host to thousands of refugees from South Sudan, who now face deportation to their native country. According to American sources, President Obama officially recognised the new state after  Sudan, Egypt, Germany and Kenya were among the first to recognise the country's independence on 8 July 2011. Several states that participated in the international negotiations concluded with a self-determination referendum were also quick to acknowledge the overwhelming result. The Rationalist process included Kenya, Uganda, Egypt, Ethiopia, Libya, Eritrea, the United Kingdom and Norway.

South Sudan is a member state of the United Nations, the African Union, and the Common Market for Eastern and Southern Africa. South Sudan plans to join the Commonwealth of Nations, the East African Community, the International Monetary Fund, OPEC+, and the World Bank. Some international trade organizations categorize South Sudan as part of the Greater Horn of Africa.

Full membership in the Arab League has been assured, should the country's government choose to seek it, though it could also opt for observer status. It was admitted to UNESCO on 3 November 2011. On 25 November 2011, it officially joined the Intergovernmental Authority on Development, a regional grouping of East African states.

The United States supported the 2011 referendum on South Sudan's independence. The New York Times reported that "South Sudan is in many ways an American creation, carved out of war-torn Sudan in a referendum largely orchestrated by the United States, its fragile institutions nurtured with billions of dollars in American aid." The U.S. government's long-standing sanctions against Sudan were officially removed from applicability to newly independent South Sudan in December 2011, and senior RSS officials participated in a high-level international engagement conference in Washington, D.C., to help connect foreign investors with the RSS and South Sudanese private sector representatives. Given the interdependence between some sectors of the economy of the Republic of South Sudan and the Republic of Sudan, certain activities still require OFAC authorization. Absent a license, current Sudanese sanction regulations will continue to prohibit U.S. persons from dealing in property and interests that benefit Sudan or the Government of Sudan. A 2011 Congressional Research Service report, "The Republic of South Sudan: Opportunities and Challenges for Africa's Newest Country", identifies outstanding political and humanitarian issues as the country forges its future.

In July 2019, UN ambassadors of 37 countries, including South Sudan, have signed a joint letter to the UNHRC defending China's treatment of Uyghurs in the Xinjiang region.

Human rights 

Campaigns of atrocities against civilians have been attributed to the SPLA. In the SPLA/M's attempt to disarm rebellions among the Shilluk and Murle, they burned scores of villages, raped hundreds of women and girls and killed an untold number of civilians. Civilians alleging torture claim fingernails being torn out, burning plastic bags dripped on children to make their parents hand over weapons, and villagers burned alive in their huts if it was suspected that rebels had spent the night there. In May 2011, the SPLA allegedly set fire to over 7,000 homes in Unity State.

The UN reports many of these violations and the frustrated director of one Juba-based international aid agency calls them "human rights abuses off the Richter scale". In 2010, the CIA issued a warning that "over the next five years,...a new mass killing or genocide is most likely to occur in southern Sudan." The Nuer White Army has stated it wished to "wipe out the entire Murle tribe on the face of the earth as the only solution to guarantee long-term security of Nuer's cattle" and activists, including Minority Rights Group International, warned of genocide in Jonglei. At the beginning of 2017, genocide was imminent again.

Peter Abdul Rahaman Sule, the leader of the key opposition group United Democratic Forum, has been under arrest since 3 November 2011 over allegations linking him to the formation of a new rebel group fighting against the government.

The child marriage rate in South Sudan is 52%. Homosexual acts are illegal.

Recruitment of child soldiers has also been cited as a serious problem in the country. In April 2014, Navi Pillay, then the UN High Commissioner for Human Rights, stated that more than 9,000 child soldiers had been fighting in South Sudan's civil war.

The United Nations rights office has described the situation in the country as "one of the most horrendous human rights situations in the world". It accused the army and allied militias of allowing fighters to rape women as form of payment for fighting, as well as raid cattle in an agreement of "do what you can, take what you can." Amnesty International claimed the army suffocated to death in a shipping container more than 60 people accused of supporting the opposition.

On 22 December 2017, at the conclusion of a 12-day visit to the region, the Commission on Human Rights in South Sudan said, "Four years following the start of the current conflict in South Sudan, gross human rights violations continue to be committed in a widespread way by all parties to the conflict, in which civilians are bearing the brunt." The Commission on Human Rights in South Sudan was established by the Human Rights Council in March 2016.

Geography 

South Sudan lies between latitudes 3° and 13°N, and longitudes 24° and 36°E. It is covered in tropical forest, swamps, and grassland. The White Nile passes through the country, passing by Juba.

South Sudan's protected area of Bandingilo National Park hosts the second-largest wildlife migration in the world. Surveys have revealed that Boma National Park, west of the Ethiopian border, as well as the Sudd wetland and Southern National Park near the border with Congo, provided habitat for large populations of hartebeest, kob, topi, buffalo, elephants, giraffes, and lions.

South Sudan's forest reserves also provided habitat for bongo, giant forest hogs, red river hogs, forest elephants, chimpanzees, and forest monkeys. Surveys begun in 2005 by WCS in partnership with the semi-autonomous government of Southern Sudan revealed that significant, though diminished wildlife populations still exist, and that, astonishingly, the huge migration of 1.3 million antelopes in the southeast is substantially intact.

Habitats in the country include grasslands, high-altitude plateaus and escarpments, wooded and grassy savannas, floodplains, and wetlands. Associated wildlife species include the endemic white-eared kob and Nile Lechwe, as well as elephants, giraffes, common eland, giant eland, oryx, lions, African wild dogs, cape buffalo, and topi (locally called tiang). Little is known about the white-eared kob and tiang, both types of antelope, whose magnificent migrations were legendary before the civil war. The Boma-Jonglei Landscape region encompasses Boma National Park, broad pasturelands and floodplains, Bandingilo National Park, and the Sudd, a vast area of swamp and seasonally flooded grasslands that includes the Zeraf Wildlife Reserve.

Little is known of the fungi of South Sudan. A list of fungi in Sudan was prepared by S. A. J. Tarr and published by the then Commonwealth Mycological Institute (Kew, Surrey, UK) in 1955. The list, of 383 species in 175 genera, included all fungi observed within the then boundaries of the country. Many of those records relate to what is now South Sudan. Most of the species recorded were associated with diseases of crops. The true number of species of fungi in South Sudan is probably much higher.

In 2006, President Kiir announced that his government would do everything possible to protect and propagate South Sudanese fauna and flora, and seek to reduce the effects of wildfires, waste dumping, and water pollution. The environment is threatened by the development of the economy and infrastructure. The country had a 2019 Forest Landscape Integrity Index mean score of 9.45/10, ranking it fourth globally out of 172 countries.

Several ecoregions extend across South Sudan: the East Sudanian savanna, Northern Congolian forest–savanna mosaic, Saharan flooded grasslands (Sudd), Sahelian Acacia savanna, East African montane forests, and the Northern Acacia–Commiphora bushlands and thickets.

Climate 

South Sudan has a tropical climate, characterized by a rainy season of high humidity and large amounts of rainfall followed by a drier season.

The most rainfall is seen between May and October, but the rainy season can commence in April and extend until November. On average May is the wettest month. The season is "influenced by the annual shift of the Inter-Tropical Zone" and the shift to southerly and southwesterly winds leading to slightly lower temperatures, higher humidity, and more cloud coverage.

Demographics 

South Sudan has a population of approximately  million and a predominantly rural, subsistence economy. This region has been negatively affected by war for all but 10 of the years since 1956, resulting in serious neglect, lack of infrastructure development, and major destruction and displacement. More than 2 million people have died, and more than 4 million are internally displaced persons or became refugees as a result of the civil war and its impact.

Ethnic groups 
The major ethnic groups present in South Sudan are the Dinka at more than 1 million (approximately 15 percent combined), the Nuer (approximately five  percent), the Bari, and the Azande. The Shilluk constitute a historically influential state along the White Nile, and their language is fairly closely related to Dinka and Nuer. The traditional territories of the Shilluk and the Northeastern Dinka are adjacent. Currently, around 800,000 expatriates from the Horn of Africa are living in South Sudan.

Education 

Unlike the previous educational system of the regional Southern Sudan—which was modeled after the system used in the Republic of Sudan since 1990—the current educational system of the Republic of South Sudan follows the  system (similar to Kenya). Primary education consists of eight years, followed by four years of secondary education, and then four years of university instruction.

The primary language at all levels is English, as compared to the Republic of Sudan, where the language of instruction is Arabic. In 2007, South Sudan adopted English as the official language of communication. There is a severe shortage of English teachers and English-speaking teachers in the scientific and technical fields.

On 1 October 2019, The South Sudan Library Foundation opened South Sudan's first public library, the Juba Public Peace Library in Gudele 2.  The library currently employs a staff of over 40 volunteers and maintains a collection of over 13,000 books. The South Sudan Library Foundation was co-founded by Yawusa Kintha and Kevin Lenahan.

Languages 

The official language of South Sudan is English. All indigenous languages spoken in South Sudan are national languages of which Dinka, Nuer, Murle, Luo, Ma'di, Otuho, and Zande are the most widely spoken.

It has been proposed that Swahili be made a second official language, and it has been added to the curriculum to be taught at schools in South Sudan since they are part of the East African Community.

There are over 60 indigenous languages, most classified under the Nilo-Saharan Language family; collectively, they represent two of the first-order divisions of Nile Sudanic and Central Sudanic.

Constitution updates
The interim constitution of 2005 declared in Part 1, Chapter 1, No. 6 (1) that "[a]ll indigenous languages of Southern Sudan are national languages and shall be respected, developed and promoted." In Part 1, Chapter 1, No. 6 (2), it was stated that "English and Arabic shall be the official working languages at the level of the governments of Southern Sudan and the States as well as languages of instruction for higher education."

The government of the new independent state later removed Arabic as an official language and chose English as the sole official language.

The new transitional constitution of the Republic of South Sudan of 2011 declares in Part 1, Chapter 1, No. 6 (1) that "[a]ll indigenous languages of South Sudan are national languages and shall be respected, developed and promoted." In Part 1, Chapter 1, No. 6 (2), it is defined that "English shall be the official working language in the Republic of South Sudan, as well as the language of instruction at all levels of education."

On 6 July 2017, South Sudan stated that it might adopt Swahili as an additional official language due to its seeking Tanzania's help to send Swahili teachers to the country as it introduces the language in school curriculum ahead of its possible adoption as an official language.

Some areas
In the border region between Western Bahr el Ghazal state and Sudan are an indeterminate number of people from West African countries who settled here on their way back from Mecca – who have assumed a traditionally nomadic life – that resides either seasonally or permanently. They primarily speak Chadian languages and their traditional territories are in the southern portions of the Sudanese regions of Northern Kurdufan and Darfur.

In the capital, Juba, there are several thousand people who use non-classical Arabic, usually a pidgin called Juba Arabic, but South Sudan's ambassador to Kenya said on 2 August 2011 that Swahili will be introduced in South Sudan with the goal of supplanting Arabic as a lingua franca, in keeping with the country's intention of orientation toward the East African Community rather than Sudan and the Arab League. Nevertheless, South Sudan submitted an application to join the Arab League as a member state on 25 March 2014, which is still pending. In an interview with the newspaper Asharq Al-Awsat, the Foreign Minister of South Sudan Deng Alor Kuol said: South Sudan is the closest African country to the Arab world, and we speak a special kind of Arabic known as Juba Arabic. Sudan supports South Sudan's request to join the Arab League. Juba Arabic is a lingua franca in South Sudan.

Population

2008 census 

The "Fifth Population and Housing Census of Sudan", for Sudan as a whole, was conducted in April 2008. The census counted the Southern Sudan population at 8.26 million; However, Southern Sudanese officials rejected the census results of Southern Sudan because "the central bureau of statistics in Khartoum refused to share the national Sudan raw census data with the southern Sudan centre for census, statistics and evaluation."

In addition, President Kiir "suspected figures were being deflated in some regions and inflated in others, and that made the final tally 'unacceptable'." He claimed that the Southern Sudanese population actually constituted one-third of that of Sudan, though the census showed it to be only 22%.

Many southern Sudanese were also said to have been uncounted "due to bad weather, poor communication and transport networks, and some areas were unreachable, while many southern Sudanese remained in exile in neighbouring countries, leading to 'unacceptable results', according [to] southern Sudanese authorities." The chief American technical adviser for the census in the south said that the census-takers probably reached only 89% of the population.

2009 census 
In 2009, Sudan initiated a Southern Sudanese census ahead of the 2011 independence referendum, which would also include the South Sudanese diaspora; however, this initiative was criticised for leaving out countries with a high share of the South Sudanese diaspora, rather counting countries where the diaspora share was low.

Largest cities

Religion 

Religions followed by the South Sudanese include traditional indigenous religions, Christianity and Islam. The last census to mention the religion of southerners dates back to 1956 where a majority were classified as following traditional beliefs or were Christian while 18% were Muslim. Scholarly and some U.S. Department of State sources state that a majority of southern Sudanese maintain traditional indigenous (sometimes referred to as animist) beliefs with those following Christianity in a minority. However, according to the U.S. State Department's International Religious Freedom Report of 2012 the majority of the population adhere to Christianity, while reliable statistics on animist and Muslim belief are not available.

The Federal Research Division of the US Library of Congress states that "in the early 1990s possibly no more than 10% of southern Sudan's population was Christian". In the early 1990s, official records of Sudan claimed that the population of what was then included as South Sudan, 25% of people followed traditional religions and 5% were Christians. However, some news reports claim a Christian majority.

According to the World Christian Encyclopedia, the Catholic Church is the largest single Christian body in Sudan since 1995, with 2.7 million Catholics mainly concentrated in South Sudan. The US Episcopal Church claims the existence of large numbers of Anglican adherents from the Episcopal Church of the Sudan with 2 million members in 2005. The Presbyterian Church in Sudan is the third largest denomination in Southern Sudan. It has about one million members in 500 congregations in 2012.

A 18 December 2012 report on religion and public life by the Pew Research Center states that in 2010, 60.5% of South Sudan's population was Christian, 32.9% were followers of traditional African religion and 6.2% were Muslim. Some publishers described the conflicts prior to partition as a Muslim-Christian war, but others reject this notion, claiming Muslim and Christian sides sometimes overlapped.

Speaking at St Theresa Cathedral in Juba, South Sudanese President Kiir, a Roman Catholic, said that South Sudan would be a nation that respects freedom of religion. Amongst Christians, most are Catholic or Anglican, though other denominations are also active, and animist beliefs are often blended with Christian beliefs.

In 2022 the new Catholic bishop of Rumbek, Christian Carlassare, stated that "More than half the population of South Sudan is Christian, only 8% are Muslim. Other groups live on the margins, and have not drawn close to the Gospel. However, we live in a country where Christianity is often no more than skin deep, it hasn't grown roots in the life of the population".

Diaspora 

The South Sudanese diaspora consists of citizens of South Sudan residing abroad. The number of South Sudanese outside South Sudan has sharply increased since the beginning of the struggle for independence from the Sudan. Almost one and a half million South Sudanese have left the country as refugees, either permanently or as temporary workforce, leading to the establishment of the South Sudanese diaspora population.

The largest communities of the South Sudanese diaspora are located in North America, Western Europe, and Oceania are in the United States, Canada, United Kingdom, Australia, and small communities exist in France, Italy, Germany, Sweden, and New Zealand.

Activist Achol Jok Mach has spoken out about growing up and growing up in a diaspora community and the effect on her identity, saying: "I was only ever told, "You are South Sudanese"... It was only much later that I learned I was Dinka."

Culture 

Due to the many years of civil war, South Sudan's culture is heavily influenced by its neighbours. Many South Sudanese fled to Ethiopia, Kenya and Uganda where they interacted with the nationals and learned their languages and culture. Most of those who remained in Sudan until or after independence partially assimilated to Sudanese culture and speak Juba Arabic or Sudanese Arabic.

Most South Sudanese value knowing one's tribal origin, its traditional culture and dialect even while in exile and diaspora. Although the common languages spoken are Juba Arabic and English, Swahili might be introduced to the population to improve the country's relations with its East African neighbours.

Music 
Many music artists from South Sudan use English, Swahili, Juba Arabic, their African language or a mix of all. Popular artists like Barbz, Yaba Angelosi, De Peace Child sing Afro-beat, R&B, and Zouk; Dynamq is popular for his reggae releases; and Emmanuel Kembe who sings folk, reggae and Afro-beat. Also hip hop artists like Emmanuel Jal, FTG Metro, Flizzame and Dugga Mulla (of FMG). Emmanuel being one of the South Sudaneses music artist's who have broken through on an international level with his unique form of hip hop and a positive message in his lyrics. Jal, a former child soldier turned musician, received good airplay and album reviews in the UK and has also been sought out for the lecture circuit with major talks at popular talkfests like TED.

Games and sports 

Many traditional and modern games and sports are popular in South Sudan, particularly wrestling and mock battles. The traditional sports were mainly played after the harvest seasons to celebrate the harvests and finish the farming seasons. During the matches, they smeared themselves with ochre – perhaps to enhance the grip or heighten their perception. The matches attracted large numbers of spectators who sang, played drums and danced in support of their favourite wrestlers. Though these were perceived as competition, they were primarily for entertainment.

Association football is also becoming popular in South Sudan, and there are many initiatives by the Government of South Sudan and other partners to promote the sport and improve the level of play. One of these initiatives is South Sudan Youth Sports Association (SSYSA). SSYSA is already holding football clinics in Konyokonyo and Muniki areas of Juba in which young boys are coached. In recognition of these efforts with youth football, the country recently hosted the CECAFA youth football competitions. Barely a month earlier, it had also hosted the larger East African Schools Sports tournaments.

The South Sudan national association football team joined the Confederation of African Football in February 2012 and became a full FIFA member in May 2012. The team played its first match against Tusker FC of the Kenyan Premier League on 10 July 2011 in Juba as part of independence celebrations, scoring early but losing 1–3 to the more experienced team. Famous South Sudanese footballers are James Moga, Richard Justin, Athir Thomas, Goma Genaro Awad, Khamis Leyano, Khamis Martin, William Afani Clicks and Roy Gulwak.

The South Sudanese can boast links to top basketball players. Luol Deng was a National Basketball Association star in the United States; at the international level, he represented Great Britain. Other leading international basketball players from South Sudan include Manute Bol, Kueth Duany, Deng Gai, Ater Majok, Wenyen Gabriel, and Thon Maker. The South Sudan national basketball team played its first match against the Uganda national basketball team on 10 July 2011 in Juba.

One athlete from South Sudan, Guor Marial, competed in the 2012 Summer Olympics. Due to South Sudan not as yet possessing an official Olympics organization, and Marial not yet possessing American citizenship, he, along with three athletes from the former Netherlands Antilles, competed under the banner of Independent Olympic Athletes.

On 2 August at the 128th IOC Session, South Sudan was granted full recognition of its National Olympic Committee. South Sudan competed at the 2016 Summer Olympics with three athletes in track and field. No medals were won during this Olympics.

Esports is a new sport that has caught attention of the youth in the country, Makuer Matur Makuer is one of south Sudan's best esports player who has become a champion in both Kenya and in South Sudan. The citizens of South Sudan hope that this new sport will be able to give the new generation of children a direction and a hope of a good future ahead.

Economy 

The economy of South Sudan is one of the world's most underdeveloped with South Sudan having little existing infrastructure and the highest maternal mortality and female illiteracy rates in the world . South Sudan exports timber to the international market. The region also contains many natural resources such as petroleum, iron ore, copper, chromium ore, zinc, tungsten, mica, silver, gold, diamonds, hardwoods, limestone and hydropower. The country's economy, as in many other developing countries, is heavily dependent on agriculture.

Other than natural resources-based companies, other such organisations include Southern Sudan Beverages Limited, a subsidiary of SABMiller.

Oil 
The oilfields in the south have been significant to the economy since the latter part of the 20th century. South Sudan has the third-largest oil reserves in Sub-Saharan Africa. However, after South Sudan became an independent nation in July 2011, southern and northern negotiators were not immediately able to reach an agreement on how to split the revenue from these southern oilfields.

It is estimated that South Sudan has around 4 times the oil deposits of Sudan. The oil revenues, according to the Comprehensive Peace Agreement (CPA), were split equally for the duration of the agreement period. Since South Sudan relies on pipelines, refineries, and Port Sudan's facilities in Red Sea state in Sudan, the agreement stated that the government of Sudan in Khartoum would receive a 50% share of all oil revenues. This arrangement was maintained during the second period of autonomy from 2005 to 2011.

In the run up to independence, northern negotiators reportedly pressed for a deal maintaining the 50–50 split of oil revenues, while the South Sudanese were holding out for more favorable terms. Oil revenues constitute more than 98% of the government of South Sudan's budget according to the southern government's Ministry of Finance and Economic Planning and this has amounted to more than $8 billion in revenue since the signing of the peace agreement.

After independence, South Sudan objected to Sudan charging US$34 per barrel to transport oil through the pipeline to the oil terminal at Port Sudan. With production of around 30,000 barrels per day, this was costing over a million dollars per day. In January 2012, South Sudan suspended oil production, causing a dramatic reduction in revenue and food costs to rise by 120%. In 2017, Nile Drilling & Services became South Sudan's first locally owned and run petroleum drilling company.

China National Petroleum Corporation (CNPC) is a major investor in South Sudan's oil sector. South Sudan's economy is under pressure to diversify away from oil as oil reserves will likely halve by 2020 if no new finds are made, according to the International Monetary Fund (IMF).

Debt 
In terms of South Sudan's external debt, Sudan and South Sudan maintain a shared debt of approximately US$38 billion, all of which has accumulated throughout the past five decades. Though a small portion of this debt is owed to such international institutions as the World Bank and the International Monetary Fund (approximately US$5.3 billion according to a 2009 report provided by the Bank of Sudan), the bulk of its debt load is actually owed to numerous foreign actors that have provided the nation with financial loans, including the Paris Club (over US$11 billion) and also non-Paris Club bilateral creditors (over US$13 billion).

The Paris Club refers to an informal group of financial officials from 19 of the world's most influential economies, including such member nations as the United States, the United Kingdom, Germany, France and Canada, while non-Paris Club bilateral creditors refers to any entity that does not enjoy permanent/associated status as a Paris Club member. Private bilateral creditors (i.e. private commercial banks and private credit suppliers) account for the majority of the remainder (approximately US$6 billion of the total debt).

East African Community membership 
The presidents of Kenya and Rwanda invited the Autonomous Government of Southern Sudan to apply for membership to the East African Community upon the independence of South Sudan in 2011, and South Sudan was reportedly an applicant country as of mid-July 2011. Analysts suggested that South Sudan's early efforts to integrate infrastructure, including rail links and oil pipelines, with systems in Kenya and Uganda indicated intention on the part of Juba to pivot away from dependence on Sudan and toward the EAC.

On 17 September 2011, the Daily Nation quoted a South Sudanese MP as saying that while his government was eager to join the EAC, it would likely delay its membership over concerns that its economy was not sufficiently developed to compete with EAC member states and could become a "dumping ground" for Kenyan, Tanzanian, and Ugandan exports. This was contradicted by President Salva Kiir, who announced South Sudan had officially embarked on the application process one month later. The application was initially deferred by the EAC in December 2012, and incidents with Ugandan boda-boda operators in South Sudan created political tension.

In December 2012, Tanzania officially agreed to South Sudan's bid to join the EAC, clearing the way for the world's newest state to become the regional bloc's sixth member. In May 2013, the EAC set aside $82,000 for the admission process. Starting after the EAC Council of Ministers meeting in August 2013, was projected to take at least four years. At the 14th Ordinary Summit held in Nairobi in 2012, EAC heads of state approved the verification report that was presented by the Council of Ministers, then directed it to start the negotiation process with South Sudan.

A team was formed to assess South Sudan's bid; however, in April 2014, the nation requested a delay in the admissions process, presumably due to South Sudanese Civil War.

South Sudan's Minister of Foreign Affairs, Barnaba Marial Benjamin, claimed publicly in October 2015 that, following unpublished evaluations and meetings of a special technical committee in May, June, August, September and October, the committee has recommended that South Sudan be allowed to join the East African Community.

South Sudan was eventually approved for membership in East African Community in March 2016, and formally acceded with the signature of the treaty in April 2016.

South Sudan and the Commonwealth of Nations 

South Sudan has applied to join the Commonwealth of Nations, considering that South Sudan was part of the Anglo-Egyptian Sudan, and has 2 republics in the Commonwealth of Nations, Kenya and Uganda as neighbouring countries.

Transport

Railway 

South Sudan has  of single-track  gauge railway line from the Sudanese border to Wau terminus. There are proposed extensions from Wau to Juba. There are also plans to link Juba with the Kenyan and Ugandan railway networks.

Air 

The busiest and most developed airport in South Sudan is Juba Airport, which has regular international connections to Asmara, Entebbe, Nairobi, Cairo, Addis Ababa, and Khartoum. Juba Airport was also the home base of Feeder Airlines Company and Southern Star Airlines.

Other international airports include Malakal, with international flights to Addis Ababa and Khartoum; Wau, with weekly service to Khartoum; and Rumbek, also with weekly flights to Khartoum. Southern Sudan Airlines also serves Nimule and Akobo, which have unpaved runways. Several smaller airports exist throughout South Sudan, the majority consisting of little more than dirt runways.

On 4 April 2012, plans were unveiled to launch a South Sudanese national airline, primarily for domestic service at first but eventually expanding to international service.

Humanitarian situation 

According to the United Nations, there are 8.3 million people in need of humanitarian aid in South Sudan as of January 2021. South Sudan is acknowledged to have some of the worst health indicators in the world. The under-five infant mortality rate is 135.3 per 1,000, whilst maternal mortality is the highest in the world at 2,053.9 per 100,000 live births. In 2004, there were only three surgeons serving in southern Sudan, with three proper hospitals, and in some areas there was just one doctor for every 500,000 people.

The epidemiology of HIV/AIDS in the South Sudan is poorly documented but the prevalence is believed around 3.1%. According to a 2013 study, South Sudan "probably has the highest malaria burden in sub-Saharan Africa". South Sudan is one of the few countries where dracunculiasis still occurs.

At the time of the Comprehensive Peace Agreement of 2005, humanitarian needs in Southern Sudan were massive. However, humanitarian organizations under the leadership of the UN Office for the Coordination of Humanitarian Affairs (OCHA) managed to ensure sufficient funding to bring relief to the local populations. Along with recovery and development aid, humanitarian projects were included in the 2007 Work Plan of the United Nations and partners. More than 90% of the population of South Sudan live on less than $1 a day, despite the GDP per capita of the entirety of Sudan being $1200 ($3.29/day).

In 2007, the United Nations OCHA (under the leadership of Éliane Duthoit) decreased its involvement in Southern Sudan, as humanitarian needs gradually diminished, slowly but markedly turning over control to the recovery and development activities of NGOs and community-based organisations.

Famine reportedly led to deaths in Northern Bahr el Ghazal and Warrap states in mid-2011, though the state governments of both denied hunger there was severe enough to cause fatalities.

In Pibor County located in the Jonglei State, in December 2011 and January 2012, cattle raids led to border clashes that eventually resulted in widespread ethnic violence, with thousands of deaths and tens of thousands of South Sudanese being displaced, and hundreds of Médecins Sans Frontières staff went missing. The government declared the area a disaster zone and took control from local authorities. South Sudan has a very high rate of child marriage. Violence against women is common in the country, and South Sudan's laws and policies have been criticized as inadequate in offering protection.

Water crisis 

The water supply in South Sudan is faced with numerous challenges. Although the White Nile runs through the country, water is scarce during the dry season in areas that are not located on the river.

About half the population does not have access to an improved water source, defined as a protected well, standpipe or a handpump within one kilometre. The few existing piped water supply systems are often not well maintained and the water they provide is often not safe to drink. Displaced people returning home put a huge strain on infrastructure, and the government institutions in charge of the sector are weak. Substantial external funding from numerous government agencies and non-governmental organizations is available to improve water supply.

Numerous non-governmental organizations support water supply in Southern Sudan, such as Water is Basic, Water for South Sudan, the Obakki Foundation and Bridgton-Lake Region Rotary Club from North America.

Refugees 

As of February 2014, South Sudan was host to over 230,000 refugees, with the vast majority, over 209,000, having arrived recently from Sudan, because of the War in Darfur. Other African countries that contribute the most refugees to South Sudan are the Central African Republic, Ethiopia, and the Democratic Republic of the Congo. As a result of the war that erupted in December 2013, more than 2.3 million people – one in every five people in South Sudan – have been forced to flee their homes, including 1.66 million internally displaced people (with 53.4 per cent estimated to be children) and nearly 644,900 refugees in neighbouring countries. Some 185,000 internally displaced people (IDPs) have sought refuge in UN Protection of Civilians (PoC) sites, while around 90 percent of IDPs are on the run or sheltering outside PoC sites. Consequently, UNHCR is stepping up its response through an inter-agency collaborative approach under the leadership of the Humanitarian Coordinator, and working with the International Organization for Migration (IOM). In early February 2013, UNHCR started distributing relief items outside the UN base in Malakal, South Sudan, which was expected to reach 10,000 people.

2017 famine 

On 20 February 2017 South Sudan and the United Nations declared a famine in parts of former Unity State, with the warning that it could spread rapidly without further action. Over 100,000 people were affected. The UN World Food Programme said that 40% of the population of South Sudan, 4.9 million people, need food urgently. U.N. officials said that President Salva Kiir Mayardit was blocking food deliveries to some areas. Furthermore, UNICEF warned that more than 1 million children in South Sudan were subjected to malnutrition.

An outbreak of fall armyworm further threatened sorghum and maize production by July 2017.

Notable people
Abraham Guem (born 1999), middle-distance runner 
Guor Maker (born 1984), Olympic marathon runner
 Mangok Mathiang (born 1992), Australian-Sudanese basketball player for Hapoel Eilat of the Israeli Basketball Premier League
 Lucia Moris (born 2001), runner

See also 
Outline of South Sudan

Notes

References

Further reading

 – Sudan
Walter C. Soderlund, E. Donald Briggs, The Independence of South Sudan: The Role of Mass Media in the Responsibility to Prevent, Waterloo: Wilfrid Laurier University Press, 2014. pp. $38.99 (paper), 
 Mohamed Omer Beshir: The Southern Sudan. Background to Conflict. C. Hurst & Co., London 1968.

External links

 Government of South Sudan
 Government of South Sudan;– USA and UN Mission 
 Government of South Sudan- UK Mission
 South Sudan. The World Factbook. Central Intelligence Agency.
 
 South Sudan profile from the BBC News.
 
 Photographer's Account of South Sudan – "The Cost of Silence: A Traveling Exhibition"
 "Sudan's Shaky Peace", National Geographic, November 2010.
 Photo gallery by George Steinmetz.
 UN Outrage at South Sudan Attack

 
2011 establishments in South Sudan
Central African countries
Countries in Africa
East African Community
East African countries
Arabic-speaking countries and territories
English-speaking countries and territories
Federal republics
Least developed countries
Member states of the African Union
Member states of the United Nations
States and territories established in 2011
Landlocked countries